Ewa Drzyzga (born in December 1967 in Kraków) is a Polish journalist and TV presenter. She was a host of talk-show Rozmowy w toku in 2000–2016 and since 2017 hosts medical show 36,6°C. on TVN.

She started her career in the RMF Radio.
She received three Telekameras and one Gold Telekamera.

She is married to journalist Marcin Borowski and has two children with him: Stanisław and Ignacy.

Filmography
 1998 – Demons of Wars (Demony wojny wg Goi) as RMF FM journalist
 2003 – Na Wspólnej as herself
 2005 – Niania as herself (guest starring)

References

1967 births
Living people
Journalists from Kraków
Polish television personalities
Television talk show hosts